Mispillion Hundred is a hundred in Kent County, Delaware, United States. Mispillion Hundred was formed in 1682 as one of the original Delaware Hundreds. Its primary community is Harrington.

References

Hundreds in Kent County, Delaware